Jokikylä is a district and a small village of the city of Oulu, Haukipudas, Finland,  with approximately 100 residents. 

The Laestadianism, a conservative Lutheran movement, is strongly represented in Jokikylä.
There is a little school with classes 0–2 in Jokikylä.

References

Villages in Finland
Districts of Oulu